Donja Meka Gruda is a village in the municipality of Bileća, Republika Srpska, Bosnia and Herzegovina.

References

See also 

Gornja Meka Gruda

Villages in Republika Srpska
Populated places in Bileća